The Lefcourt Colonial Building is a 45-story office building located in Midtown Manhattan, in New York City, built by Abraham E. Lefcourt. The  neo-Gothic building, located at 295 Madison Avenue at East 41st Street, was completed in 1930.

References

External links

 
 

Skyscraper office buildings in Manhattan
Art Deco architecture in Manhattan
Art Deco skyscrapers
Midtown Manhattan
Office buildings completed in 1930
Madison Avenue